Clepsis dumicolana is a moth species of the family Tortricidae. It is found in Spain, France, Italy, Belgium, the Netherlands, Germany, Switzerland, Austria, Slovenia, and the Near East.

The wingspan is about 20 mm. The adult moths fly from mid-May until October.

The larvae feed on Hedera helix.

The species was originally endemic to the Mediterranean area and is a neozoon in Central and Western Europe. It is thought to have arrived there with imports of ivy plants from Southern Europe.

References

De Prins, W. & Baugnee, J.-Y., 2008 - Clepsis dumicolana (Lepidoptera: Tortricidae), new to the Belgian fauna - Phegea 36 (4): 127-130
Hausenblas, D., 2007 - Clepsis dumicolana (Zeller, 1847): ein neuer Wickler fur die Fauna Deutschlands (Lepidoptera: Tortricidae) - Entomologische Zeitschrift 117(2): 67-70
Muus, T.S.T., Corver, S.C., 2008 - Microlepidoptera.nl, de kleinere vlinders van Nederland

External links
Fauna Europaea
Lepidoptera of Belgium
Lepiforum e. V. (in German)

Clepsis
Moths described in 1847
Tortricidae of Europe